Construction surveying or building surveying (otherwise known as "staking", "stake-out", "lay-out", "setting-out" or "BS") is to stake out reference points and markers that will guide the construction of new structures such as roads or buildings. These markers are usually staked out according to a suitable coordinate system selected for the project.

History of construction surveying 

 The nearly perfect squareness and north–south orientation of the Great Pyramid of Giza, built c. 2700 BC, affirm the Egyptians' command of surveying.
A recent reassessment of Stonehenge (c.2500 BC) suggests that the monument was set out by prehistoric surveyors using peg and rope geometry.
In the sixth century BC geometric based techniques were used to construct the tunnel of Eupalinos on the island of Samos.
Modern technology advanced surveying's accuracy and efficiency. For example, surveyors used to use two posts joined with a chain to measure distance. This technology could only account for distance and not elevation. Current technology uses the Global Positioning System (GPS) that can measure the distance from point A to point B as well as differences in elevation.

Elements of the construction survey

 Survey existing conditions of the future work site, including topography, existing buildings and infrastructure, and underground infrastructure whenever possible (for example, measuring invert elevations and diameters of sewers at manholes)
 Stake out lot corners, stake limit of work and stake location of construction trailer (clear of all excavation and construction)
 Stake out reference points and markers that will guide the construction of new structures
 Verify the location of structures during construction
 Provide horizontal control on multiple floors
 Conduct an As-Built survey: a survey conducted at the end of the construction project to verify that the work authorized was completed to the specifications set on plans

Coordinate systems used in construction

Land surveys and surveys of existing conditions are generally performed according to geodesic coordinates.  However, for the purposes of construction a more suitable coordinate system will often be used.  During construction surveying, the surveyor will often have to convert from geodesic coordinates to the coordinate system used for that project.

Chainage or station 

In the case of roads or other linear infrastructure, a chainage (derived from Gunter's Chain - 1 chain is equal to 66 feet or 100 links) will be established, often to correspond with the centre line of the road or pipeline.  During construction, structures would then be located in terms of chainage, offset and elevation. Offset is said to be "left" or "right" relative to someone standing on the chainage line who is looking in the direction of increasing chainage.  Plans would often show plan views (viewed from above), profile views (a "transparent" section view collapsing all section views of the road parallel to the chainage) or cross-section views (a "true" section view perpendicular to the chainage).  In a plan view, chainage generally increases from left to right, or from the bottom to the top of the plan.  Profiles are shown with the chainage increasing from left to right, and cross-sections are shown as if the viewer is looking in the direction of increasing chainage (so that the "left" offset is to the left and the "right" offset is to the right).

"Chainage" may also be referred to as "Station".

Building grids

In the case of buildings, an arbitrary system of grids is often established so as to correspond to the rows of columns and the major load-bearing walls of the building.  The grids may be identified alphabetically in one direction, and numerically in the other direction (as in a road map).  The grids are usually but not necessarily perpendicular, and are often but not necessarily evenly spaced. Floors and basement levels are also numbered. Structures, equipment or architectural details may be located in reference to the floor and the nearest intersection of the arbitrary axes.

Other coordinate systems

In other types of construction projects, arbitrary "plan north" reference lines may be established, using Cartesian coordinates that may or may not necessarily correspond to true coordinates. The technique is called localized grid.
This method uses the plan building grids as their own ordinates. A point of beginning is established at the southwest cross grid. 
IE [N1000.000,E3000.000] 
The grids are added together heading north and east to make each line its own ordinate.

Equipment and techniques used in construction surveying

Surveying equipment, such as levels and theodolites, are used for accurate measurement of angular deviation, horizontal, vertical and slope distances. With computerisation, electronic distance measurement (EDM), total stations, GPS surveying and laser scanning have supplemented (and to a large extent supplanted) the traditional optical instruments.

The builder's level measures neither horizontal nor vertical angles. It simply combines a spirit level and telescope to allow the user to visually establish a line of sight along a level plane. When used together with a graduated staff it can be used to transfer elevations from one location to another. An alternative method to transfer elevation is to use water in a transparent hose as the level of the water in the hose at opposite ends will be at the same elevation.  A double right angle prism verifies grid patterns, isolating layout errors.

Equipment and techniques used in mining and tunneling

Total stations are the primary survey instrument used in mining surveying.

Underground mining
A total station is used to record the absolute location of the tunnel walls' (stopes), ceilings (backs), and floors as the drifts of an underground mine are driven. The recorded data is then downloaded into a CAD programme, and compared to the designed layout of the tunnel.

The survey party installs control stations at regular intervals. These are small steel plugs installed in pairs in holes drilled into walls or the back. For wall stations, two plugs are installed in opposite walls, forming a line perpendicular to the drift. For back stations, two plugs are installed in the back, forming a line parallel to the drift.

A set of plugs can be used to locate the total station set up in a drift or tunnel by processing measurements to the plugs by intersection and resection.

Profession  
Building Surveying emerged in the 1970s as a profession in the United Kingdom by a group of technically minded General Practice Surveyors. Building Surveying is a recognized profession within Britain and Australia. In Australia in particular, due to risk mitigation/limitation factors the employment of surveyors at all levels of the construction industry is widespread. There are still many countries where it is not widely recognized as a profession. The Services that Building Surveyors undertake are broad but include:

Construction design and building works
Project Management and monitoring
CDM Co-ordinator under the Construction (Design & Management) Regulations 2015
Property Legislation adviser
Insurance assessment and claims assistance
Defect investigation and maintenance adviser
Building Surveys and measured surveys
Handling Planning applications
Building Inspection to ensure compliance with building regulations
Undertaking pre-acquisition surveys
Negotiating dilapidations claims

Building Surveyors also advise on many aspects of construction including:

 design
 maintenance
 repair
 refurbishment
 restoration
 conservation
Clients of a building surveyor can be the public sector, Local Authorities, Government Departments as well as private sector organisations and work closely with architects, planners, homeowners and tenants groups. Building Surveyors may also be called to act as an expert witness. It is usual for building surveyors to undertake an accredited degree qualification before undertaking structured training to become a member of a professional organisation. For Chartered Building Surveyors, these courses are accredited by the Royal Institution of Chartered Surveyors.  Other professional organisations that have building surveyor members include CIOB, ABE, HKIS and RICS.

With the enlargement of the European community, the profession of the Chartered Building Surveyor is becoming more widely known in other European states, particularly France. Chartered Building Surveyors, where many English speaking people buy second homes.

Distinction from land surveyors

In the United States, Canada, the United Kingdom and most Commonwealth countries land surveying is considered to be a distinct profession. Land surveyors have their own professional associations and licensing requirements. The services of a licensed land surveyor are generally required for boundary (also known as cadastral) surveys for

 creating new boundaries sanctioned by landowners by way of subdivision plans or plats, and for
 relocating the boundaries of existing land parcels using legal descriptions, registered documents, surveyors' field notes and plans, and evidence of monumentation and other marks on or under ground.

See also 
 Civil Engineering
 Engineering Drawing
 Surveying
 Chartered Surveyor

References

External links 
 Surveying outline University of British Columbia, Carlos E.Ventura
 As-builts – Problems & Proposed Solutions — Discussion on Building Surveys within Construction industry by Stephen R. Pettee, CCM

Further reading 
DELANEY, Miriam and Anne GORMAN, ‘Surveying’, in Studio Craft & Technique for Architects (London, 2015) pp.284–317

WELLS, Matthew:  Survey: Architectural Iconographies (Zurich: Park Books, 2021) 

YEOMANS, David: ‘The Geometry of a Piece of String’, Architectural History 54 (2011) 23-47

Construction surveying